Rosario is one of the 67 municipalities of Chihuahua, in northern Mexico. The municipal seat lies at Valle del Rosario. The municipality covers an area of 1785.6 km².

As of 2010, the municipality had a total population of 2,235, down from 3,130 as of 2005. 

The municipality had 62 localities, none of which had a population over 1,000.

References

Municipalities of Chihuahua (state)